The 1993–94 Canada men's national ice hockey team represented Canada at the 1994 Winter Olympics held at the Fjellhallen in Gjøvik and the Håkons Hall in Lillehammer, Norway.
Canada's team, coached by Tom Renney, won the silver medal.

1994 Winter Olympics roster
Head coach: Tom Renney
Mark Astley
Adrian Aucoin
David Harlock
Corey Hirsch
Todd Hlushko
Greg Johnson
Fabian Joseph
Paul Kariya
Chris Kontos
Manny Legacé
Ken Lovsin
Derek Mayer
Petr Nedvěd
Dwayne Norris
Greg Parks
Allain Roy
Jean-Yves Roy
Brian Savage
Brad Schlegel
Wally Schreiber
Chris Therien
Todd Warriner
Brad Werenka

See also
 Canada men's national ice hockey team
 Ice hockey at the 1994 Winter Olympics
 Ice hockey at the Olympic Games
 List of Canadian national ice hockey team rosters

References

 
Canada men's national ice hockey team seasons